John Martin Henni (June 15, 1805 – September 7, 1881) was a Swiss-born prelate of the Roman Catholic Church who served as the first Archbishop of the Archdiocese of Milwaukee, Wisconsin from 1843 until his death in 1881.

Biography

Early life and education
John Henni was born in the village of Misanenga, municipality of Obersaxen, in the canton of Graubünden in Switzerland. He received his early education in St. Gallen and Lucerne, and was sent to study philosophy and theology in Rome in 1824. He accepted an invitation from Bishop Edward Fenwick to join the Diocese of Cincinnati in the United States. He arrived at Baltimore, Maryland, in 1829, and then completed his studies at the seminary in Bardstown, Kentucky.

Priesthood
Henni was ordained to the priesthood by Bishop Fenwick on February 2, 1829. He was assigned to the spiritual care of the German Catholics of Cincinnati, and served as professor of philosophy at The Athenaeum in the same city. Shortly afterwards, he was transferred to Canton, Ohio and was also charged with several surrounding missions in Northern Ohio. From 1830 to 1834, Fr. Henni was in charge of St. John's Catholic church in Canton. In 1834, he returned to Cincinnati and was named pastor of Holy Trinity Church as well as vicar general of the diocese. He founded the Wahrheits-Freund in 1837, the first German Catholic newspaper in the United States, and served as its editor until 1843.

Henni also organized the St. Aloysius' Orphans Aid Society in the Bond Hill section of Cincinnati. In May 1843, he accompanied Bishop John Baptist Purcell to the Fifth Provincial Council of Baltimore, where he proposed a seminary for the education of priests to minister among German Catholics.

Episcopacy
On November 28, 1843, Henni was appointed the first Bishop of the newly erected Diocese of Milwaukee in Wisconsin by Pope Gregory XVI. He received his episcopal consecration on March 19, 1844 from Bishop Purcell, with Bishops Michael O'Connor and Richard Pius Miles serving as co-consecrators.

Henni was instrumental in the establishment of Marquette University, which was opened two days before his death. He also founded the St. Francis Seminary in St. Francis, Wisconsin out of his residence, and brought various orders of nuns and priests to Milwaukee. The main building at St. Francis Seminary, Henni Hall, is named in his honor and is listed on the National Register of Historic Places.

Because of his work expanding the Catholic presence in Wisconsin (particularly the German-speaking Catholic population), Pope Pius IX created the Roman Catholic Province of Milwaukee on February 12, 1875.

See also
 Catholic Church hierarchy
 Catholic Church in the United States
 Historical list of the Catholic bishops of the United States
 List of Catholic bishops of the United States
 Lists of patriarchs, archbishops, and bishops

References

External links 
Archbishop Henni biography by Archdiocese of Milwaukee
John Martin Henni, 1805 – 1881 at Dictionary of Wisconsin History

1805 births
1881 deaths
19th-century Roman Catholic archbishops in the United States
Roman Catholic archbishops of Milwaukee
Marquette University people
Religious leaders from Wisconsin
Roman Catholic Archdiocese of Cincinnati
Swiss emigrants to the United States
University and college founders